Chungju Station is a railway station on Chungbuk Line and Jungbunaeryuk Line in Chungju, North Chungcheong, South Korea.

References

External links

Railway stations in North Chungcheong Province
Korail stations
Chungju